Albena Zdravkova (born 22 September 1969) is a Bulgarian luger. She competed in the women's singles event at the 1992 Winter Olympics.

References

External links
 

1969 births
Living people
Bulgarian female lugers
Olympic lugers of Bulgaria
Lugers at the 1992 Winter Olympics
Place of birth missing (living people)